Colegio Marcelino Champagnat in La Pintana, Chile, opened in 1983, and since 1988 has been run by the Marist Brothers. It currently offers basic and professional technical education, and is subsidized by the state.

History
Santa Rita de Casia Basic School opened in 1983. The Marist Brothers acquired the school and an adjacent lot in 1987, giving the school its present name.

References

External links 
 Photos of school

Marist Brothers schools
Schools in Chile
Catholic schools in Chile
Educational institutions established in 1983
1983 establishments in Chile